Reverberi is a family name of Italian origin. It may refer to: 

 Gian Franco Reverberi, Italian composer and musician
 Gian Piero Reverberi, Italian composer, arranger and conductor
 Pietro Reverberi, Italian basketball referee

Italian-language surnames